Rio Largo is a municipality located in the Brazilian state of Alagoas. Its population was 75,394 (2020) and its area is 309 km².

References

Municipalities in Alagoas